Uusitaloia is a genus of Russian sheet weavers that was first described by Y. M. Marusik, S. Koponen & S. N. Danilov in 2001.

Species
 it contains only two species:
Uusitaloia transbaicalica Marusik, Koponen & Danilov, 2001 – Russia
Uusitaloia wrangeliana Marusik & Koponen, 2009 – Russia

See also
 List of Linyphiidae species (Q–Z)

References

Araneomorphae genera
Linyphiidae
Spiders of Russia